WTBX (93.9 FM) is a U.S. radio station in Hibbing, Minnesota, serving the Iron Range region. The station is owned by Midwest Communications and airs a hybrid format of hot adult contemporary and modern adult contemporary.  In 2008, the station began leaning adult top 40 during the evening hours with the addition of tracks topping contemporary hit radio charts, similar to KBMX in Duluth, MN. The station has since shifted to a Hot AC leaning contemporary hit radio format in order to fill the Hot AC void in the Hibbing market. The stations' playlist mainly consists of music from the 1990s, 2000s and today, with 1980s music sprinkled in every once in a while. Even with the recent musical shifts, the station continues to have a heavy emphasis on new hit music, and continues to air CHR slated shows, such as American Top 40 and Open House Party.

WTBX broadcasts from a 486 foot tower located southwest of downtown Hibbing on Town Line Road using a twelve-bay FM antenna combined with sister station WUSZ. 

During the 1980s, WTBX aired a contemporary hit radio format and had an FM translator on 97.7 MHz in Duluth, MN. Today, the 97.7 translator is owned by VCY America and simulcasts WQRM.

WTBX is not licensed by the FCC to broadcast in digital HD Radio.

Sister stations

Midwest Communications also owns WUSZ, WMFG, WMFG-FM, WDKE, WEVE and WNMT on the Iron Range.  All Seven  stations, along with the former KMFG, were sold to Midwest for $5.4 million. All Seven stations share the same studio location at 807 W. 37th Street, Hibbing.

External links
93.9 WTBX official website

Radio stations in Minnesota
Hot adult contemporary radio stations in the United States
Radio stations established in 1982
Midwest Communications radio stations
1982 establishments in Minnesota